Nebria kratteri is a species of ground beetle in the Nebriinae subfamily that can be found in Albania, Greece, Italy, and North Macedonia.

Subspecies
Nebria kratteri kratteri Dejean, 1831
Nebria kratteri pindica Jeanne, 1974

References

External links
Nebria kratteri at Carabidae of the World

kratteri
Beetles described in 1830
Beetles of Europe